Identity ~prologue~ is Dream 16th single. First pressings included a Custom Robo Battle Revolution sticker cover and one of nine trading cards. The title track was used as the theme song for dream's ID stage musical, the opening song for the GameCube game Custom Robo Battle Revolution, and the image song for the 2004 Yokohama International Women's Ekiden. A PV for its a-side was released on the ID CD+DVD and their final single as an 8-member group.

Track list
 Identity ~prologue~ (Original)
 Identity ~prologue~ (Instrumental)

Information
 Lyrics by: Hagiwara Shintaro
 Music by: Bounceback
 Arrangement by: A.T.S

External links
 http://www.oricon.co.jp/music/release/d/534423/1/

2004 singles
Dream (Japanese group) songs
2004 songs
Avex Trax singles